Emanon is an American musical duo formed in 1995, in Los Angeles, California, composed of rapper and singer-songwriter Aloe Blacc and record producer Exile.

History
Emanon released the extended play (EP) Anon and On, on Ill Boogie Records in 2002 and The Waiting Room on Shaman Works Recordings in 2005. Exile's first album Dirty Science, released in 2006, includes contributions from Slum Village, Kardinal Offishall and Oh No.

On February 3, 2015, Aloe Blacc answered a question on his official facebook page from a user asking about the status of Emanon's upcoming album, Bird's Eye View, saying it was "finished" and he was "meeting with Exile to decide how" they should release the long-awaited album. The album was later released as Dystopia in 2016.

Discography

Studio albums
 Imaginary Friends (1996)
 The Waiting Room (2005)
 Dystopia (2016)

EPs
 Acid 9 (1998)
 Anon & On (2002)

Compilation albums
 Steps Through Time 1997-2000 (2001)

References

External links
Emanon at MySpace
Exile at MySpace
Aloe Blacc at MySpace

Musical groups established in 1995
Musical groups from Los Angeles
Hip hop groups from California
Hip hop duos
American musical duos